Aega is a genus of isopods in the family Aegidae, containing the following species:

Aega acuminata Hansen, 1897
Aega acuticauda Richardson, 1910
Aega affinis Milne Edwards, 1840
Aega antarctica Hodgson, 1910
Aega angustata Whitelegge, 1901
Aega antennata Richardson, 1910
Aega approximata Richardson, 1910
Aega bicarinata Leach, 1818
Aega chelipous Barnard, 1960
Aega concinna Hale, 1940
Aega crenulata Lutken, 1859
Aega dofleini Thielemann, 1910
Aega ecarinata Richardson, 1898
Aega falcata Kensley & Chan, 2001
Aega falklandica Kussakin, 1967
Aega hamiota Bruce, 2004
Aega hirsuta Schiödte & Meinert, 1879
Aega komai Bruce, 1996
Aega lecontii (Dana, 1853)
Aega leptonica Bruce, 1988
Aega magnifica (Dana, 1853)
Aega maxima Hansen, 1897
Aega megalops Norman & Stebbing, 1886
Aega microphthalma Dana, 1853
Aega monophthalma Johnston, 1834
Aega nanhaiensis Yu, 2007
Aega platyantennata Nunomura, 1993
Aega psora (Linnaeus, 1758)
Aega punctulata Miers, 1881
Aega semicarinata Miers, 1875
Aega serripes H. Milne Edwards, 1840
Aega sheni Yu & Bruce, 2006
Aega stevelowei Bruce, 2009
Aega tridens Leach, 1815
Aega truncata Richardson, 1910
Aega urotoma Barnard, 1914
Aega webbii (Guérin-Méneville, 1836)
Aega whanui Bruce, 2009

References

Cymothoida
Isopod genera